Rhysida longipes, sometimes known as Minor blue leg, is a species of centipedes in the family Scolopendridae. Three subspecies are recognized. It is sometimes used as a pet in some countries.

Subspecies
Rhysida longipes afghanistana
Rhysida longipes malayica
Rhysida longipes simplicior

References

Newport G. (1845). Monograph of the class Myriapoda order Chilopoda; with observations on the general arrangement of the Articulata - Transactions of the Linnean Society of London, 19: 265-302, 349-439, see p. 411.

External links
http://agris.fao.org/agris-search/search.do?recordID=US201600048013
Establishment of the Adventive Centipede Rhysida longipes longipes (Newport, 1845; Scolopendromorpha: Scolopendridae: Otostigminae) in South Florida 2015
XIII.—SPERMATELEOSIS IN THE CENTIPEDE RHYSIDA LONGIPES
Establishment of the Adventive Centipede Rhysida longipes longipes (Newport, 1845; Scolopendromorpha: Scolopendridae: Otostigminae) in South Florida
Rhysida longipes longipes (Newport, 1845) in the Chagos Islands, Indian Ocean (Chilopoda, Scolopendromorpha, Scolopendridae).

longipes
Animals described in 1845